Nabaṭī, historically also known as najdi, is a vernacular Arabic poetry that stems from the Arabic varieties of the Arabian Peninsula. It exists in contrast to the poetry written according to the classical rules of literary Arabic.

Also known as "the people's poetry" and "Bedouin poetry", nabati has a long heritage, with examples of the nabati form referenced by the medieval historian Ibn Khaldun in his Muqaddimah (Introduction), first published in 1377.

Nabati poetry has a pedigree that reaches back centuries. Bedouin poets composed verse similar in structure, theme, metre and rhyme to the works of Imru'l Qays and other pre-Islamic poets. These qasidas set the classical standard for hundreds of years. Remarkably, until quite recently, verse composed by illiterate Bedouin masters of the art has remained close in spirit and language to these examples. Prominent historical nabati poets include Ibn Daher who lived in Ras Al Khaimah in the 16th century and whose work still influences the poetry today. Ibn Li'bun (1790–1831), known in the eastern coast of the Arabian Peninsula ⁦‪‬⁩ region as "Prince of the nabati Poets" was also prominent figure in the form, who corresponded with other poets across the region and whose work has led to many traditional popular tunes in Arabia.

Nabati was long an aural tradition and researchers have encountered Bedouin who can memorise 20,000 poems.

An important cultural element in the daily life of the region, nabati poetry was used to declare war, seek peace and resolve tribal disputes. It is considered unique to Arabia. The form was a key element not only of regional culture but communications prior to the 20th century but lapsed with the development of the region following the discovery of oil. It has enjoyed a considerable renaissance and is now a celebrated medium of both poetry and song, particularly in the UAE where practitioners such as Ousha bint Khalifa Al Suwaidi (known as Fatat Al Arab) have become celebrated figures.

Etymology
The term nabati is considered to have been derived from the Nabatean civilization, an Arab kingdom that arose in north-western Arabia and had its cultural center in the city of Petra.

In the United Arab Emirates 
Among the first Classical Arabic UAE poets to gain importance in this part of the world during the twentieth century were Mubarak Al Oqaili (1880–1954), Salem bin Ali Al Owais (1887–1959) and Ahmed bin Sulayem (1905?–1976). Salem bin Ali Al Owais was born in Al-Heera, a village between Sharjah and Ajman. Three other poets of importance in the UAE were Khalfan Musabah (1923–1946), Sheikh Saqr Al Qasimi (1925–1993), an ex-ruler of Sharjah, and Sultan bin Ali Al Owais (1925–2000). The three poets, known as the Heera group, grew up in the village of Al-Heera in Sharjah and were close friends.

One of the largest nabati poetry competitions known as Million's Poet has been held biannually in the UAE since 2006 and is broadcast as a reality TV show. The UAE's first Nabati academy was founded in 2008.

References

Further reading 

Arabic poetry